Mieczysław Kotlarczyk (1908–1978) was a Polish actor, theatre director and literary critic.

Kotlarczyk studied Polish Philology at the Jagiellonian University (Kraków), graduating with Master's (1931) and Doctorate (1936) degrees in philosophy. Kotlarczyk was the theatre mentor of Karol Wojtyła (future Pope John Paul II). He was active in the underground theatre in occupied Poland, and founder of the underground Teatr Rapsodyczny in Kraków.

In 1975 he signed the Letter of 59.

References

1908 births
1978 deaths
Polish literary critics
Polish theatre directors
20th-century Polish male actors